Pseudonezumia is a genus of rattails. The generic name means "false Nezumia".

Species
There are currently five recognized species in this genus:
 Pseudonezumia cetonuropsis (C. H. Gilbert & C. L. Hubbs, 1916)
 Pseudonezumia japonica Okamura, 1970
 Pseudonezumia japonicus Okamura, 1970
 Pseudonezumia parvipes (H. M. Smith & Radcliffe, 1912)
 Pseudonezumia pusilla (Sazonov & Shcherbachev, 1982) (Tiny whiptail)

References

Macrouridae